Svetozar Mijin (Serbian Cyrillic: Cвeтoзap Mијин; born 25 July 1978 in Novi Sad, SFR Yugoslavia) is a Serbian retired footballer who played as a defensive midfielder. Mijin played 4 games in CFR Cluj's 2005 Intertoto Cup campaign in which the club reached the final.

Honours
CFR Cluj
Divizia B: 2003–04
UEFA Intertoto Cup runner-up: 2005

References

External links
 
 Squad-Mahindra United at Indianfootball.
 
 
 Profile at Vf.se

1978 births
Living people
Serbian footballers
Serbian expatriate footballers
FK Rudar Pljevlja players
FK Glasinac Sokolac players
F.C. Ashdod players
Maccabi Kiryat Gat F.C. players
CFR Cluj players
FC Politehnica Iași (1945) players
Israeli Premier League players
Liga Leumit players
Liga I players
Liga II players
Expatriate footballers in Israel
Expatriate footballers in Romania
Expatriate footballers in India
Expatriate footballers in Sweden
Serbian expatriate sportspeople in Israel
Serbian expatriate sportspeople in Romania
Serbian expatriate sportspeople in India
Serbian expatriate sportspeople in Sweden
Association football midfielders